Andrey Potapenko (born 9 February 2000) is a Belarusian professional footballer who plays for Gomel.

Honours
BATE Borisov
Belarusian Cup winner: 2019–20

Gomel
Belarusian Cup winner: 2021–22

References

External links 
 
 

2000 births
Living people
Belarusian footballers
Association football midfielders
FC BATE Borisov players
FC Arsenal Dzerzhinsk players
FC Smolevichi players
FC Slutsk players
FC Gomel players